Saint-Priest is a commune in the Metropolis of Lyon in the Auvergne-Rhône-Alpes region in east-south France. The 19th-century French historian and epigrapher Auguste Allmer (1815–1899) was a tax collector in Saint-Priest.

It is the fourth-largest suburb of the city of Lyon, and is located to its southeast side. The Saint-Priest station is served by local trains to Lyon and Saint-André-le-Gaz.

Population

See also
Communes of the Metropolis of Lyon

References

External links
 Official website 

Communes of Lyon Metropolis
Dauphiné